Cawelo is an unincorporated community in Kern County, California. Its ZIP Code is 93263.

The name recalls the initial letters of the partners in the agriculture interest that founded the place: Camp, West, and Lowe.

References

Unincorporated communities in Kern County, California
Unincorporated communities in California